The Flintstone Comedy Show is an American animated television series revival and spin-off of The Flintstones produced by Hanna-Barbera that aired on NBC from November 22, 1980  to October 24, 1981. Outside North America, the show was released under title of Flintstone Frolics.

The series contained six segments: The Flintstone Family Adventures, Bedrock Cops, Pebbles, Dino and Bamm-Bamm, Captain Caveman, Dino and the Cavemouse and The Frankenstones.

Overview
The series also featured new characters (the Frankenstones, the Cavemouse) as well as older characters (Penny, Wiggy, Moonrock and Schleprock of 1971's The Pebbles and Bamm-Bamm Show and 1972's The Flintstone Comedy Hour on CBS, Al Capp's the Shmoo from his show The New Shmoo which aired on NBC in 1979, and Captain Caveman from his own series on ABC in 1977 which lasted three seasons).

A series of gags, educational spots, games, how-to-draw and a dance-of-the-week were featured in-between the six segments every week. In 1982, reruns of the show were repackaged for two seasons under the title The Flintstone Funnies. Reruns of "Dino and the Cavemouse" aired on the Disney Channel adaption of Wake, Rattle, and Roll.

The Flintstone Family Adventures
This segment featured the traditional antics and adventures of The Flintstones and The Rubbles.

Season 1 (1980–81)

Season 2 (1981–82)

Bedrock Cops

Production
In 1975 Alan Reed revealed in an interview with radio historian Chuck Schaden that Hanna-Barbera was developing a series about Fred and Barney's adventures as Bedrock policemen. Alan Reed passed away on June 14, 1977 while the cartoon was still in development and was replaced by Henry Corden.

Plot
Fred and Barney are part-time police officers assisted by the Shmoo as a trainee where they work under the direction of Sgt. Boulder. The trio fought crime in the city of Bedrock, most of the time chasing after the Frankenstones' pet monster Rockjaw.

Season 1 (1980–81)

Season 2 (1981–82)

Pebbles, Dino and Bamm-Bamm
This was a Flintstones-themed adaptation of the "mystery-solving teens and a pet" format popularized by Scooby-Doo and its various spin-offs in the 1970s (including Captain Caveman's original show on ABC). In this series, Pebbles and Bamm-Bamm (similar, yet aged down a little, from their appearance in The Pebbles and Bamm-Bamm Show) with pet dinosaur Dino solve mysteries in the city of Bedrock. They would sometimes be accompanied by pals Penny, Wiggy and Moonrock.

Season 1 (1980–81)

Season 2 (1981–82)

Captain Caveman
This segment served as a prequel to the earlier series Captain Caveman and the Teen Angels, focusing on Captain Caveman's time in Bedrock before he was frozen in ice. Captain Caveman (under his "secret identity" of Chester the office boy), Betty and Wilma work for Lou Granite (based on Lou Grant) at The Daily Granite. To disguise himself as Chester, Captain Caveman wore a pair of glasses and a tie (similar to the Clark Kent persona used by Superman). Despite the simplicity of his disguise, he required a coat rack and an elaborate transformation sequence to become Captain Caveman.

Season 1 (1980–81)

Season 2 (1981–82)

Dino and Cavemouse
The segment featured Dino pitted against a pesky little Cavemouse in chase sequences similar to Tom and Jerry. These sequences were story edited and the character of Cavemouse was developed by notable animation director Tex Avery, the last project he worked on before his death. Two segments aired per episode.

Season 1 (1980–81)

Season 2 (1981–82)

The Frankenstones
This segment featured the Flintstones' neighbors The Frankenstones: Frank, his wife Hidea, their kooky daughter Atrocia, and their teenage son Freaky, who is friends with fellow teenager Pebbles Flintstone.

Season 1 (1980–81)

Season 2 (1981–82)

Voice cast
 Gay Autterson as Betty Rubble, Wiggy Rockstone
 Mel Blanc as Barney Rubble, Captain Caveman, Dino
 Henry Corden as Fred Flintstone
 Ruta Lee as Hidea Frankenstone
 Kenneth Mars as Lou Granite
 Mitzi McCall as Penny Pillar
 Don Messick as Bad-Luck Schleprock
 Charles Nelson Reilly as Frank Frankenstone
 Paul Reubens as Freaky Frankenstone
 Zelda Rubinstein as Atrocia Frankenstone
 Micheal Sheehan as Bamm-Bamm Rubble
 John Stephenson as Mr. Slate
 Russi Taylor as Pebbles Flintstone, the Cavemouse
 Jean Vander Pyl as Wilma Flintstone
 Lennie Weinrib as Moonrock Crater, Sgt. Boulder
 Frank Welker as Shmoo, Rockjaw

Additional voices
 René Auberjonois
 Joe Baker
 Buster Jones
 Frank Nelson
 Marilyn Schreffler
 Lurene Tuttle
 Paul Winchell

References

External links
 
 The Flintstone Comedy Show at The Big Cartoon DataBase

The Flintstones spin-offs
1980 American television series debuts
1981 American television series endings
1980s American animated comedy television series
1980s American police comedy television series
American animated television spin-offs
American children's animated comedy television series
American children's animated mystery television series
Crossover animated television series
English-language television shows
Li'l Abner
NBC original programming
Television series by Hanna-Barbera
Television series set in prehistory
Television series about cavemen